The 2020–21 FIU Panthers men's basketball team represented Florida International University in the 2020–21 NCAA Division I men's basketball season. The Panthers, led by third-year head coach Jeremy Ballard, played their home games at Ocean Bank Convocation Center in Miami, Florida as members of the East Division of Conference USA.

Previous season
The Panthers finished the 2019–20 season 19–13, 9–9 in CUSA play to finish in fifth place. They defeated Rice in the first round of the CUSA tournament and were set to face Charlotte in the quarterfinals before the remainder of the tournament was canceled amid the COVID-19 pandemic.

Roster

Schedule and results

|-
!colspan=12 style=| Regular season

|-
!colspan=9 style=| Conference USA tournament
|-

Source

References

FIU Panthers men's basketball seasons
FIU Panthers
FIU Panthers men's basketball
FIU Panthers men's basketball